Hans Ucko (born 1946) is a priest of the Church of Sweden and a member of the World Council of Churches (WCC).
He has been extensively involved in interfaith dialog, particularly between Christians and Jews.
He has written a number of books on the subject.

Birth and education
Hans Ucko was born in 1946 in Sweden and educated in France, Sweden, Israel, and India. 
He studied in Paris at the "Institut Eglise et Monde Juif" and in Jerusalem at the Swedish Theological Institute and at the Shalom Hartman Institute.
He obtained a Ph.D. in Theology from Serampore College, Calcutta.

Career

From 1981 to 1989 Ucko was the Church of Sweden's Executive Secretary for Jewish-Christian Relations, interreligious dialogue and East Asian Relations.
Ucko was appointed Program Secretary in the WCC's Office on Interreligious Relations and Dialogue. 
He was President of Religions for Peace Europe. 
In 2003 he delivered the Dr Stanley Samartha Memorial lecture to the Bangalore Initiative for Religious Dialogue, speaking on the topic: "Towards an ethical code of conduct for conversion".
This became the subject of an article in "Current Dialogue".

Ucko edits the WCC's "Current Dialogue" publication.
He sits on the Board of Trustees of Hartford Seminary.
He is an official observer at the International Council of Christians and Jews.
As of 2012 he was a member of the council of the World Day of Prayer and Action for Children, and co-chair of the Arigatou Foundation's joint campaign with UNICEF.

Bibliography

Ucko has written several books and articles on inter-religious dialog.

References

1946 births
Living people
21st-century Swedish Lutheran priests
20th-century Swedish Lutheran priests